Alwina is a given name. Notable people with the given name include:

People
 Alwina Gossauer (1841–1926), Swiss women professional photographer and businesswoman from Rapperswil
 Alwina Valleria (1848–1925), American-born soprano

Fiction
Alwina, a lead character in the Mulawin series played by Angel Locsin.